European Pitch and putt Strokeplay Championship is the singles European competition organized by the European Pitch and Putt Association (EPPA) since 2011.

2011 European Strokeplay Championship
The first championship was played on 15–17 July 2011, at Imjelt course, in Drammen (Norway), and crowned Irish player Ian Farrelly as European Champion.

References

European Strokeplay
2011 establishments in Europe
Recurring sporting events established in 2011